Pa Chong (also Romanized as Pā Chong) is a village in Doshman Ziari Rural District, in the Central District of Kohgiluyeh County, Kohgiluyeh and Boyer-Ahmad Province, Iran. According to 2006 census, its population was 125, in 29 families.

References 

Populated places in Kohgiluyeh County